Awesome Adventures is an adventure/travel series that takes teens on journeys around the world to experience a wide range of destinations and diverse activities. The E/I syndicated series is produced and distributed by Steve Rotfeld Productions (SRP). The show has been hosted by Nicole Dabeau since 2012. In 2014 Awesome Adventures was nominated for an Emmy award in the category of Best Daytime Travel Series.

Hosts
Nicole Dabeau (Current)
Christopher Scott Grimaldi 
Mystro Clark 
A.T. Montgomery
J. August Richards
Taran Killam (guest host, 1 episode)

Places Traveled

United States
Boise, ID
Chicago, Illinois
Detroit, MI
Hawaii
Minnesota
Moab, UT
Portland, OR
San Antonio, Texas
South Carolina
Stowe, VT
Lake Tahoe
Pittsburgh, PA
Denver, CO
Philadelphia, PA

Overseas
Africa
Aruba
Australia
Bahamas
Belize
Brazil
Cayman Islands
Colombia
Curaçao
England
Haiti
Jamaica
Malaysia
Nevis
Puerto Rico
Scotland
St. Kitts
St. Lucia
Tahiti

References

External links

Episode Guide

1998 American television series debuts
1990s American children's television series
2000s American children's television series
2010s American children's television series
1990s American documentary television series
2000s American documentary television series
2010s American documentary television series
American children's adventure television series
American children's education television series
American travel television series
English-language television shows
First-run syndicated television programs in the United States
Television series about teenagers